James Robert McGarry (born 9 April 1998) is a New Zealand professional footballer who plays as a left-back for A-League club Central Coast Mariners.

Club career
McGarry was scouted to attend the APFA academy in Christchurch from Dunedin in 2011.  McGarry would have professional trials with Chelsea and Sheffield United.  When the academy relocated to Wellington to come under the banner of the Wellington Phoenix Academy Director Jess Ibrom recruited McGarry to be part of the Wellington Phoenix academy.

Wellington Phoenix
On 10 September 2015, McGarry joined Wellington Phoenix together with his countryman Logan Rogerson.

On 10 May 2016, Wellington Phoenix released McGarry from his contract so he could gain game time at Wellington United during the winter. He then returned to play for the Wellington Phoenix, mainly appearing in their reserve team.

Willem II
Following the expiration of McGarry's contract at Wellington Phoenix, McGarry signed for Eredivisie club Willem II on a two-year contract, alongside fellow New Zealander Michael Woud. He was named in the starting eleven for the first game of the Eredivisie season against VVV-Venlo, playing 63 minutes before being substituted.

Wellington Phoenix
McGarry returned to Wellington Phoenix on 23 October 2020, following his departure from Willem II in May that year.

Newcastle Jets
McGarry joined Newcastle Jets on a two-year deal in July 2022. McGarry scored against his former side, Wellington Pheonix, in his first match against them. McGarry made 11 appearances across all competitions for Newcastle, before leaving the club mid-way through his first season.

Central Coast Mariners
McGarry's departure from Newcastle came via a swap deal with the Central Coast Mariners, which saw McGarry join the Mariners in exchange for Thomas Aquilina heading to Newcastle. The Mariners and Jets share a fierce rivalry, the F3 Derby, with player movement between the two clubs rare and often controversial.

McGarry scored his first goal for the Mariners against his first A-League club, Wellington Phoenix, just as he had done for Newcastle.

After impressing in his first 4 appearances for the Mariners, McGarry signed a 2 year contract extension to stay at the club beyond that season.

International career
McGarry represented New Zealand at both the 2015 FIFA U-17 World Cup and the 2017 FIFA U-20 World Cup. He made his debut for New Zealand national football team on 17 November 2019 in a friendly against Lithuania.

Personal life
He is the son of former New Zealand football and international player Michael McGarry.

References

External links
 
 
 
 

Living people
1998 births
Association football midfielders
New Zealand association footballers
New Zealand international footballers
Wellington Phoenix FC players
Wellington United players
Willem II (football club) players
Newcastle Jets FC players
Central Coast Mariners FC players
A-League Men players
Eredivisie players
New Zealand Football Championship players
New Zealand expatriate association footballers
Expatriate footballers in the Netherlands